Amalia Cecilia Bruni is an Italian politician. She was the centre-left candidate for President of Calabria in the 2021 Calabrian regional election.

References 

Living people
Year of birth missing (living people)
Place of birth missing (living people)
21st-century Italian politicians
21st-century Italian women politicians
People from Calabria

Politicians of Calabria
Members of the Regional Council of Calabria